Kinnah Phiri (born 30 October 1954) is a Malawian football coach and former player who is the head coach of Jwaneng Galaxy.

Playing career
Born in Blantyre, Kinnah began playing football for local side Big Bullets F.C., and in 1982 was offered a contract by UAE club Sharjah SC. He was not allowed to leave the country, but he moved to Swaziland to play for Manzini Wanderers where he would finish his playing career.

Phiri was the inspiration behind the Malawi national football team's finest hours in the late 1970s when Malawi twice won the East and Central Africa Challenge Cup. He scored 71 goals in 115 games.

In his club career, he stated that he had scored over 700 goals.

Coaching career 
Bakili Bullets, Malawi (Head coach)
Free State Stars, South African Premier Soccer League (Head coach)
Malawi U-23 (Head coach)
Malawi (Head coach)

Career statistics

International
Scores and results Malawi's goal tally first.

See also 
 List of top international men's football goalscorers by country
 List of men's footballers with 100 or more international caps
 List of men's footballers with 50 or more international goals

References

External links

Kinnah Phiri at Footballdatabase

1954 births
Living people
People from Blantyre
Malawi international footballers
Nyasa Big Bullets FC players
Manzini Wanderers F.C. players
Free State Stars F.C. managers
Malawi national football team managers
Malawian expatriate footballers
Expatriate footballers in Eswatini
Malawian expatriate sportspeople in Eswatini
Malawian footballers
Malawian football managers
Expatriate soccer managers in South Africa
2010 Africa Cup of Nations managers
FIFA Century Club
Association football forwards